The 2005–06 North Carolina Tar Heels men's basketball team represented the University of North Carolina at Chapel Hill during the 2005–06 NCAA Division I men's basketball season. Their head coach was Roy Williams. The team played its home games in the Dean Smith Center in Chapel Hill, North Carolina as a member of the Atlantic Coast Conference.

Recruiting

Roster

Schedule

Team players drafted into the NBA

References 

North Carolina
North Carolina
North Carolina Tar Heels men's basketball seasons
Tar
Tar